Adelin of Séez (also, Hadelin, Adelheim, Adelhelm, or Adalhelmus) (died c. 910) was a Benedictine monk and abbot at the abbey of Anisole. He was the Bishop of Séez for twenty-six years starting around 884. He is noted for authoring a work on the life and miracles of Opportuna of Montreuil (Vita et miracula Sanctae Opportunae).

See also
List of Catholic saints

References

9th-century births
910 deaths
Year of birth unknown
Year of death uncertain
French Roman Catholic saints
Bishops of Séez
9th-century French bishops
10th-century French bishops
French Benedictines
10th-century Christian saints
Saints of West Francia
French abbots
Benedictine abbots
9th-century people from West Francia
9th-century Latin writers